Banksia dallanneyi var. mellicula is a variety of Banksia dallanneyi subsp. dallanneyi. It was known as Dryandra lindleyana var. mellicula until 2007, when Austin Mast and Kevin Thiele sunk all Dryandra into Banksia. Since there was already a Banksia named Banksia lindleyana, Mast and Thiele had to choose a new specific epithet for D. lindleyana and hence for this variety of it. As with other members of Banksia ser. Dryandra, it is endemic to the South West Botanical Province of Western Australia.

References

Further reading
 
 
 

dallanneyi var. mellicula
Endemic flora of Western Australia
Eudicots of Western Australia
Taxa named by Kevin Thiele